Albany woollybush refers to two related flowering plants in family Proteaceae, native to southwestern Australia. The plants are named after Albany, Western Australia.

Adenanthos sericeus
Adenanthos × cunninghamii, a hybrid between Adenanthos sericeus and Adenanthos cuneatus.

See also
Woollybush
Adenanthos

References